Göta is a Swedish given name, which is the female equivalent of Göte. It may refer to:

Göta Ljungberg (1893–1955), Swedish singer
Göta Pettersson (1926–1993), Swedish gymnast

Other uses
Göta, Sweden
Göta älv, a river in Sweden
Göta älvbron, a bridge in Gothenburg
Göta Canal, a waterway in Sweden
Göta Court of Appeal, in Jönköping
Göta highway, in southern Sweden
Göta Lejon, a theatre in Stockholm

Swedish feminine given names